María Echavarría (born 7 July 1960) is a Colombian archer. She competed in the women's individual event at the 1992 Summer Olympics.

References

External links
 

1960 births
Living people
Colombian female archers
Olympic archers of Colombia
Archers at the 1992 Summer Olympics
Place of birth missing (living people)
20th-century Colombian women
21st-century Colombian women